The Benetton B191 is a Formula One racing car, with which the Benetton team competed in the 1991 Formula One season and at the beginning of 1992. Designed by John Barnard and Mike Coughlan, the car made its debut at the 1991 San Marino Grand Prix, driven by two Brazilian drivers, three-time World Drivers' Champion Nelson Piquet and Roberto Moreno. The B191 was powered by the Ford HBA5 V8 engine in an exclusive deal with Ford, and ran on Pirelli tyres. Following the Belgian Grand Prix the team replaced Moreno with German newcomer Michael Schumacher.

History
Nelson Piquet gave the B191 its only win at the 1991 Canadian Grand Prix after Nigel Mansell's leading Williams-Renault suffered electrical failure less than half a lap from the finish gifting Piquet the last win of his Formula One career.

The car was pressed into service for the first three races of the  season with small upgrades to bodywork and suspension. This car was dubbed the B191B. Schumacher remained with the team while Martin Brundle replaced the retiring Nelson Piquet in the team's second car.

The B191B was replaced by the Benetton B192 following the 1992 Brazilian Grand Prix.

Complete Formula One results
(key) (results in italics indicate fastest lap)

* 6 points scored in  using Benetton B190B* 80 points scored in  using Benetton B192

References

B191
1991 Formula One season cars
1992 Formula One season cars